Mossley was a parliamentary constituency which returned one Member of Parliament (MP) to the House of Commons of the United Kingdom Parliament.

It was created at the 1918 general election as a county division of Lancashire, taking areas formerly in the Gorton and Prestwich constituencies. The area consisted of small towns which were increasingly suburban to Manchester, such as Droylsden and Failsworth (now part of Oldham borough), together with some towns then further out such as Denton, and stretching out to the edge of Saddleworth Moor to take in Mossley.

This created a mixed area which declined in social status during its existence as Manchester expanded to the east and its industrial area expanded. The electorate also increased over time, and in a boundary change in 1950 the seat was divided with the areas adjacent to Manchester forming the new Droylsden constituency while the remainder including Mossley itself formed part of Ashton-under-Lyne.

Boundaries
The Borough of Mossley, the Rural District of Limehurst, and the Urban Districts of Audenshaw, Denton, Droylsden, Failsworth, and Lees.

Members of Parliament

Constituency created (1918)

Election results

1910s election results 

 Hopkinson was not a member of any political party but was adopted by both the local Conservative and Liberal Associations, received the Coalition Coupon and saw himself as a Liberal. However, he said this did not bind him to support the coalition government or to vote with it, and that he had accepted the coupon for the good of the country.

1920s election results

1930s election results

1940s election results

References 

Parliamentary constituencies in North West England (historic)
Constituencies of the Parliament of the United Kingdom established in 1918
Constituencies of the Parliament of the United Kingdom disestablished in 1950
Politics of Tameside